Tomb of Gia Long, officially Thien Tho Mausoleum, is a royal tomb of the Nguyễn dynasty which is located in the Hương Thọ commune of Hương Trà district, some  south of the city of Huế.

History 
The tomb was originally built for Emperor Gia Long's first wife, Empress Thừa Thiên after her death in 1814 but later became Gia Long's and some of his family members' burial site. Today, the tomb is badly damaged and some of its structures have deteriorated.

Architecture 
The tomb is a group of tombs and was well known for its beauty. The tomb originally had a main complex that formed by the double-grave tomb of the emperor and empress Thừa Thiên in the center; Minh Thanh Temple, the dedicated temple of Gia Long and Thừa Thiên in the right, and the monument of Gia Long in the left. They were built at a plain and large hill of Thiên Thọ mount. On the right lies empress Thuận Thiên's tomb (Thiên Thọ Hữu Tomb) and her dedicated temple, the Gia Thanh Temple, built upon the foothills of Thuận Sơn mount. A lot of Nguyễn dynasty royal family members, including Gia Long's mother (Thoại Thánh Tomb) and elder sister (Hoàng Cô Tomb), were also buried here. 

References

External links 

 

Religious buildings and structures completed in 1814
Gia Long
Gia Long
Buildings and structures in Huế